American singer Lady Gaga has recorded material for seven studio albums and three extended plays (EP), and has been featured on songs on other artists' respective albums. After being dropped from a solo contract with Def Jam Recordings, Gaga worked as a songwriter for Sony/ATV Music Publishing, where Akon helped her sign a joint deal with Interscope Records and his own label KonLive Distribution. She released her debut album The Fame (2008), which produced the global chart-topping singles "Just Dance" and "Poker Face". She collaborated with different producers, primarily RedOne, Fernando Garibay, Martin Kierszenbaum, and Rob Fusari. With influences of the 1980s pop music, the album discusses Gaga's desire for fame, love, sexuality, money and drugs. A reissue of her first album, titled The Fame Monster (2009), explores the darker side of fame and contained eight newly recorded songs, including "Speechless" – written solely by Gaga – "Alejandro", "Telephone" and "Bad Romance".

On her second full-length album, Born This Way (2011), Gaga reunited with RedOne and Garibay, and sought new collaborators, including DJ Snake, DJ White Shadow, Jeppe Laursen, and Robert John "Mutt" Lange; the lattermost produced the country rock song "You and I", written solely by Gaga. The album's themes include sexuality, religion, freedom, feminism and individualism. Primarily influenced by synthpop and dance-pop, it incorporated musical genres which had not been previously explored by Gaga, such as electronic rock and techno. "Americano" and "Scheiße" included Spanish and faux-German lyrics, respectively. Gaga's third album Artpop (2013) included the singles "Applause" and "Do What U Want". As executive producer, she enlisted longtime collaborators DJ White Shadow and RedOne, and for the first time Zedd and Madeon. Described as "a celebration and a poetic musical journey", the album revolves around her personal views of fame, love, sex, feminism, self-empowerment, overcoming addiction and reactions to media scrutiny. 

In 2014, Gaga and Tony Bennett released a collaborative album titled Cheek to Cheek, which consists of jazz standards and swing classics from composers such as George Gershwin, Cole Porter, Jerome Kern, Duke Ellington and Irving Berlin. Her fifth studio album, Joanne (2016), which had Mark Ronson as the executive producer, is a more personal album, with family influences. In 2020, she released Chromatica, a house-influenced album with lyrics that thematize mental health, depression and finding love through hardship. It features guest vocals from Ariana Grande on "Rain on Me", Blackpink on "Sour Candy" and Elton John on "Sine from Above". Her second album with Bennett, titled Love for Sale, followed in 2021, where the duo covered Cole Porter songs.

In addition to her studio work, Gaga has recorded songs for film soundtracks, including "Fashion" from Confessions of a Shopaholic (2009), and "Til It Happens to You" from The Hunting Ground (2015). She and Bradley Cooper recorded the soundtrack for the movie A Star Is Born, released in 2018, which they composed with other collaborators. It contains elements of blues rock, country and pop. For the 2022 film Top Gun: Maverick, Gaga wrote the song "Hold My Hand", and also composed its score alongside Hans Zimmer and Harold Faltermeyer.

Songs

Notes

References

External links 
 Lady Gaga News at Broadcast Music Incorporated (BMI)
 Lady Gaga songwriting details at the American Society of Composers, Authors and Publishers (ASCAP)

 
Lady Gaga